The Reign of Terror is a historical period during the early part of the French Revolution.

Reign of Terror may also refer to:

Music
Reign of Terror (demo), a 1984 demo album by Death
Reign of Terror (Sleigh Bells album) (2012)
Reign of Terror (Capture the Crown album) (2014)
Reign of Terror, a 2015 EP by Terror Universal

Other uses
Reign of Terror (Osage) or Osage Indian murders, a series of murders in Osage County, Oklahoma from 1921 to 1925
Reign of Terror (book)
Reign of Terror (film), a 1949 film about the historical period
The Reign of Terror (Doctor Who), a 1964 Doctor Who serial
Revolutionary terror, the institutionalized application of force to counterrevolutionaries

See also
Great Terror (disambiguation)
Terror (disambiguation)